TN6 or TN-6 may refer to:
 Tennessee's 6th congressional district
 Tennessee State Route 6
 TN6, a postcode district in Wealden, England; see TN postcode area